ExxonMobil Tower (Malay: Menara ExxonMobil) formerly known as Menara Esso is a skyscraper located in the Kuala Lumpur City Centre of Kuala Lumpur, Malaysia. The building currently is the headquarters of ExxonMobil Malaysia.

It is the first building to complete in the Kuala Lumpur City Centre development before KLCC Park, Suria KLCC, Maxis Tower and Petronas Twin Towers.

The , 30-storey tower is a rectangular shaped building, with a virtually column free interior. For aesthetics, the north and south elevations are set-back at level 5, while the north elevation facing the public park is further set-back at levels 22 and 26.

The soft landscaping at Menara ExxonMobil also includes a semi-private garden which leads into the 20-hectare KLCC Park.

References

ExxonMobil buildings and structures
Office buildings completed in 1997
1997 establishments in Malaysia
Skyscraper office buildings in Kuala Lumpur
20th-century architecture in Malaysia